Hebeloma cylindrosporum is a species of mushroom-forming fungus in the family Hymenogastraceae. It was described as new to science in 1965 by French mycologist Henri Romagnesi.

See also
List of Hebeloma species

References

cylindrosporum
Fungi described in 1965
Fungi of Europe